"223's" is a song by American rapper YNW Melly featuring American rapper 9lokkNine, released as the lead single from YNW Melly's debut studio album Melly vs. Melvin on August 9, 2019. It reached the top 40 of the US Billboard Hot 100 and in New Zealand.

Background
The track, originally by 9lokknine and released on his December 2018 mixtape Lil Glokk That Stole Khristmas, was "rebranded" as a collaboration with YNW Melly, who has been in jail since February 2019 after turning himself in on double murder charges and possession of marijuana. After being pulled over for a broken tail light, YNW Melly led a one-hour police chase through the city of Albuquerque, New Mexico ending with Melly fleeing; the track references this incident. It was released as a single in August 2019 after going viral on the video app TikTok.

Lyrics
The lyric refers to gang violence, with the title referring to semi-automatic rifles that fire .223 cartridges.

Music video
An official music video was released on YNW Melly's official YouTube channel on November 2, 2019.

Charts

Weekly charts

Year-end charts

Certifications

References

2019 singles
2019 songs
YNW Melly songs